The Suhua Highway Improvement Project (colloquially 蘇花改) was a major highway project in northeast Taiwan to improve and bypass dangerous sections of the Suhua Highway, part of Provincial Highway 9.

The Suhua Highway is the main road connecting Su'ao Township and Hualien City. A portion of the original alignment was built alongside very steep cliffs high above the Pacific Ocean. Because of the rugged terrain, it was  often closed due to heavy rain, typhoons, or landslides, leading to injuries and deaths.
 
In the 1990s, the Ministry of Transportation and Communications (MOTC) started planning a new freeway to connect Su'ao and Hualien, as part of National Freeway 5. However, it was controversial because of its environmental impact. Instead, the MOTC developed a scaled-down project, which constructed bridges and tunnels in three dangerous sections: Su'ao–Dong'ao, Nan'ao–Heping, and Heping–Qingshui. It cut travel time along the coastline from 2.5 hours to 80 minutes.

The project was named the Suhua Highway Alternative Project (colloquially 蘇花替 ) in 2008. Its name was changed to its current name in 2010.

Construction started in 2011 and was expected to take five years and cost 46.5 billion New Taiwan dollars. Due to difficulties in construction, the project was finally completed in 2020 at a cost of 55.17 billion New Taiwan dollars.

References

External links

Suhua Highway Improvement Engineering Office, Directorate General of Highways, Ministry of Transportation and Communications

Highways in Taiwan
Engineering projects
Road transportation in Taiwan